Las Animas National Forest was established by the U.S. Forest Service in Colorado and New Mexico on March 1, 1907 with , only 420 of which were in New Mexico.  On May 27, 1910 part of Las Animas was transferred to San Isabel National Forest and the remainder was returned to public domain. The name was discontinued.

References

External links
Forest History Society
Forest History Society:Listing of the National Forests of the United States Text from Davis, Richard C., ed. Encyclopedia of American Forest and Conservation History. New York: Macmillan Publishing Company for the Forest History Society, 1983. Vol. II, pp. 743-788.

Former National Forests of Colorado
Former National Forests of New Mexico